Tritonia griegi is a species of dendronotid nudibranch. It is a marine gastropod mollusc in the family Tritoniidae.

Distribution
This species is found in Norway.

References

External links 
 https://web.archive.org/web/20110718215757/http://folk.ntnu.no/vmzotbak/nudibranchia/tritoniidae/tritonia_griegi.htm

Tritoniidae
Gastropods described in 1922